The Irish News Cup was a "north-south" association football competition in Ireland involving teams from the Irish League and League of Ireland mostly located in the north-west of the island. It is thus not counted among the major all-Ireland cup tournaments, since neither League champions nor Cup winners were involved. (Derry City did win the League of Ireland title in 1996-97). It was sponsored by the Irish News and also referred to as the Irish News North West Cup. It lasted four seasons.

Winners

External links
 Irish Football Club Project Archive on All-Ireland Competitions
 Irish League Archive - Irish News Cup

Sources
M. Brodie (ed.), Northern Ireland Soccer Yearbook 1996/97
M. Brodie (ed.), Northern Ireland Soccer Yearbook 1997/98
M. Brodie (ed.), Northern Ireland Soccer Yearbook 1998/99
M. Brodie (ed.), Northern Ireland Soccer Yearbook 1999/2000
Ballymena United Football Club

Defunct all-Ireland association football cup competitions
1995–96 in Republic of Ireland association football
1996–97 in Republic of Ireland association football
1997–98 in Republic of Ireland association football
1998–99 in Republic of Ireland association football
1995–96 in Northern Ireland association football
1996–97 in Northern Ireland association football
1997–98 in Northern Ireland association football
1998–99 in Northern Ireland association football